The Hackensack Public Schools are a comprehensive community public school district that serves students in pre-kindergarten through twelfth grade from the City of Hackensack, in Bergen County, New Jersey, United States.

As of the 2019–20 school year, the district, comprising six schools, had an enrollment of 5,790 students and 431 classroom teachers (on an FTE basis), for a student–teacher ratio of 13.4:1.

The district is classified by the New Jersey Department of Education as being in District Factor Group "CD", the sixth-highest of eight groupings. District Factor Groups organize districts statewide to allow comparison by common socioeconomic characteristics of the local districts. From lowest socioeconomic status to highest, the categories are A, B, CD, DE, FG, GH, I and J.

The district's high school serves students from South Hackensack and Rochelle Park as part of sending/receiving relationships with the respective districts. In March 2020, the Maywood Public Schools announced that it had received approval from the New Jersey Department of Education to end the relationship it had established with Hackensack in 1969 and begin transitioning incoming ninth graders to Henry P. Becton Regional High School beginning in the 2020–21 school year. Maywood cited costs of nearly $14,800 per student in 2018 to send students to Hackensack while Becton would start a cost of $10,500 per student.

History

Superintendent Karen Lewis was suspended in 2016. Assistant superintendent Joseph Cicchelli became an acting superintendent instead of fulfilling his planned retirement. Rosemary Marks became the superintendent in 2017.

Awards and recognition
Hackensack High School (HHS) was named one of America's best high schools by Newsweek magazine in its 2013 rankings.  Ranked among the top six percent of high schools in the country, HHS was recognized based on various criteria including Advanced Placement (AP) programs, the four-year, on-time graduation rate and number of graduates accepted into a two- or four-year college program.

Jackson Avenue Elementary School was recognized by Governor Jim McGreevey in 2003 as one of 25 schools selected statewide for the First Annual Governor's School of Excellence award.

Schools
Schools in the district, with 2019–20 enrollment data from the National Center for Education Statistics, are:
Preschool
Early Childhood Development Center
Elementary schools
Fairmount Elementary School (617 students in grades PreK-4)
Rhonda Ashton-Loeb, Principal
Fanny Meyer Hillers School (570 students in grades PreK-4)
Joy Dorsey Whitting, Principal
Jackson Avenue School (442 students in grades PreK-4)
Christopher Moran, Principal
Nellie K. Parker School (533 students in grades PreK-4)
Lillian Whitaker, Principal
Middle school
Hackensack Middle School (1,571 students in grades 5-8)
Dr. Joy Dorsey Whiting, Principal
High school
Hackensack High School (1,918 students in grades 9-12)
James Montesano, Principal

Administration
Core members of the district's administration are:
Robert Sanchez, Superintendent
Dora Zeno, Interim Business Administrator / Board Secretary

Board of education
The district's board of education, with nine members, sets policy and oversees the fiscal and educational operation of the district through its administration. As a Type II school district, the board's trustees are elected directly by voters to serve three-year terms of office on a staggered basis, with three seats up for election each year held as part of the April school election. As one of the 13 districts statewide with school elections in April (five of which are in Bergen County), voters also decide on passage of the annual school budget.

Demographics
In 1948 the district had a school with all African-American students but which had teachers of multiple races. While the school was in operation during de jure educational segregation in the United States, Noma Jensen of Journal of Negro Education wrote "This school is all Negro by reason of population."

References

External links

Hackensack Elementary School portal
 
School Data for the Hackensack Public Schools, National Center for Education Statistics

Public Schools
New Jersey District Factor Group CD
School districts in Bergen County, New Jersey